Boddu Gopalam (1927–2004), popularly known as B. Gopalam, was a singer and music director of South Indian films and All India Radio.

He was born at Tulluru in Guntur district of Andhra Pradesh, India. His father Ramadasu, was also a musician and an exponent of Harikatha. Gopalam learned vocal music and playing the violin under Varanasi Brahmayya Sastry in Vijayawada.

Career
Gopalam was an active member of the Praja Natya Mandali in Guntur district and campaigned in favour of the poor and downtrodden. He was closely associated with Vemulapalli Srikrishna and Sheik Nazar. While working as a vocalist at All India Radio, singing the songs of Devulapalli Krishna Sastry and Viswanatha Satyanarayana, he met and married a fellow singer named Renuka.

He began working in Telugu films on the invitation of Tatineni Prakasa Rao. He has worked with directors such as Ghantasala, T. V. Raju, and S. Rajeswara Rao. He later became an independent music director for the film Nala Damayanthi in Telugu and Kannada. He also sang in a few Telugu films as a playback singer.

Filmography

Composer

Singer

References

 Luminaries of 20th Century, Potti Sreeramulu Telugu University, Hyderabad, 2005.

External links
 

1927 births
2004 deaths
Indian male composers
People from Guntur district
Telugu film score composers
20th-century Indian singers
Film musicians from Karnataka
Telugu playback singers
Indian male playback singers
20th-century Indian composers
Male film score composers
20th-century Indian male singers